Hockey at the Pacific Games (known as the South Pacific Games until 2009) was introduced as a tournament for men's teams in 1979. Hockey was not played again until 2003 when a women's tournament was included in the schedule for Suva. At the 2015 Pacific Games in Port Moresby the format was changed from eleven-a-side to five-a-side, and both men's and women's tournaments were hosted.

Pacific Games

Men's tournament

Women's tournament
Women's hockey was introduced at the 2003 Pacific Games in Suva.

See also
 Oceania Cup

References

 
Pacific Games
Pacific Games
Pacific Games